Bridges Worth Burning is an album by the band Kind of Like Spitting. It was released on August 6, 2002 on Barsuk Records.

Ben Gibbard of Death Cab for Cutie contributed drums, piano, and backing vocals on this album.

Track listing
 "Passionate" – 3:53
 "We Are Both Writers" – 2:50
 "Born Beautiful" – 2:19
 "He Calls Me" – 3:48
 "Following Days" – 1:49
 "I Want Out" – 5:03
 "Canaries" – 2:26
 "Tyco Racing Set and a Christmas Story Fifteen Times" – 5:14
 "This Lemonade Is Terrible" – 1:49
 "Crossover Potential" – 2:59
 "Continental" – 6:55
 "Untitled" – 0:51

Album design by Ian Lynam.

References

External links
Bridges Worth Burning on Barsuk Records' website

2002 albums
Kind of Like Spitting albums
Barsuk Records albums
Albums produced by John Goodmanson